Birmingham Classic may refer to:

 Birmingham Classic (golf), Birmingham, Alabama
 Birmingham Classic (tennis), Birmingham, England